Dai Paterson, also known as David Paterson (born 24 April 1977) is an Australian actor, musician and composer, who has appeared in such television series as BeastMaster and Dog's Head Bay. He is theatrically trained, and has acted in such stage productions as Troy's House, The Proposal, The Resistible Rise of Arturo Ui, Henry VI, Part I, and Waiting for Godot. He is represented by United Agents based in Soho London.

Early life and education
Paterson was born in Tasmania, Australia. His parents were both involved with local theatre in Tasmania. Dai gained an interest in the craft and began training at the age of fourteen. His formal education took him to the National Institute of Dramatic Art (NIDA) in Sydney, Australia.

Career
Paterson's film debut started with Australian band Silverchair in their music video for their song "Emotion Sickness" in 1999. Between small roles, theatre and failed television series Dog's Head Bay, he landed the role of King Voden on the Canadian television series BeastMaster. His character appeared in nine episodes throughout the second season.

When his character did not return, Paterson moved on to the movie drama The Turner Affair co-starring actress Rachel Blakely. He went back to small guest appearances on various television series including Blue Heelers and Stingers before finding acclaim on the stage.

In 2003 Paterson starred opposite Maria Mercedes in Anna Kannava's art house film Dreams For Life. Paterson played the role of Martin. The film had an Australian release and received film industry nominations and awards, and was seen in film festivals in Australia, France, North America, Cyprus, and Italy.

In 2004, Paterson portrayed Danny in the play Happy New, a play about two brothers who had been traumatized in childhood and in the eye of a media storm. Paterson is working with the theatrical company So Much Art... So Few Bullets.

He starred in the unreleased Australian film Right Here, Right Now made in 2003 directed by Matthew Newton.

Paterson composed the score for the film Lake Mungo.

Paterson moved to London in 2007 and resides in the seaside town of Brighton in East Sussex. He performs with his band Rhodesia in London.

References

External links

1977 births
Male actors from Tasmania
Living people